Ognjen Gnjatić (born 16 October 1991) is a Bosnian professional footballer who plays as a defensive midfielder for Radomlje.

Club career
Born in Bugojno, SR Bosnia and Herzegovina, Gnjatić played with FK Kozara Gradiška in the 2011–12 Bosnian Premier League.

In summer 2012, Gnjatić moved to Serbia and signed for top division side FK Rad. He made his debut in the 2012–13 Serbian SuperLiga on 10 August 2012, in the first round match against FK Radnički 1923.

International career
Gnjatić was a member of the Bosnia and Herzegovina under-21 team.

Notes

References

External links
 

1991 births
Living people
People from Bugojno
Association football midfielders
Bosnia and Herzegovina footballers
Bosnia and Herzegovina under-21 international footballers
FK Kozara Gradiška players
FK Rad players
Platanias F.C. players
Roda JC Kerkrade players
Korona Kielce players
FC Erzgebirge Aue players
NK Radomlje players
Premier League of Bosnia and Herzegovina players
Serbian SuperLiga players
Super League Greece players
Eredivisie players
Eerste Divisie players
Ekstraklasa players
2. Bundesliga players
Slovenian PrvaLiga players
Bosnia and Herzegovina expatriate footballers
Expatriate footballers in Serbia
Bosnia and Herzegovina expatriate sportspeople in Serbia
Expatriate footballers in Greece
Bosnia and Herzegovina expatriate sportspeople in Greece
Expatriate footballers in the Netherlands
Bosnia and Herzegovina expatriate sportspeople in the Netherlands
Expatriate footballers in Poland
Bosnia and Herzegovina expatriate sportspeople in Poland
Expatriate footballers in Germany
Bosnia and Herzegovina expatriate sportspeople in Germany
Expatriate footballers in Slovenia
Bosnia and Herzegovina expatriate sportspeople in Slovenia
Serbs of Bosnia and Herzegovina